Renée Short (26 April 1919 – 18 January 2003) was a British Labour politician who served as Member of Parliament for Wolverhampton North East.

Early life
Born in Leamington Spa, she had a Jewish mother but was brought up by her Church of England grandparents.  She was educated at Nottingham County Grammar School and Manchester University. She was a journalist. Active in the Labour and Co-operative Parties, she served as a councillor on Hertfordshire County Council 1952–67 and Watford Rural District Council 1952–56.

Parliamentary career
Short contested St. Albans at the 1955 general election and Watford in the 1959 election.

At the 1964 general election, she was elected to succeed John Baird as Member of Parliament for Wolverhampton North East.  She retained her seat at six subsequent general elections until her retirement at the 1987 election. In the Conservative landslide at the 1983 general election, she had held on to her seat by just 214 votes, and after she stood down, her old seat was won by the Conservative candidate Maureen Hicks. She also served on the Labour National Executive Committee 1970–81 and 1983–88.

Short was on the left-wing of the Labour Party and often clashed with her constituency neighbour Enoch Powell.  She was an early advocate of abortion reform.  She was for many years national president of the Campaign for Nursery Education, and of the Nursery Schools Association; and she was vice-president of the Women's National Cancer Control Campaign.  She had hopes of being appointed to the government in 1974 but believed she had suffered by openly stating her ambition on the BBC TV election results programme (she said "If Harold's any sense, he'll know what to do").

Later life
Later in her career she received a regular credit as 'Parliamentary Adviser' to the Yorkshire Television sitcom The New Statesman.

Family
She married, in 1940, Dr Andrew Short; they had two daughters. 

Her granddaughter is actress and singer Charlotte Devaney.

References

External links 
 

1919 births
2003 deaths
Labour Party (UK) councillors
Labour Party (UK) MPs for English constituencies
Female members of the Parliament of the United Kingdom for English constituencies
Jewish British politicians
UK MPs 1964–1966
UK MPs 1966–1970
UK MPs 1970–1974
UK MPs 1974
UK MPs 1974–1979
UK MPs 1979–1983
UK MPs 1983–1987
Members of Hertfordshire County Council
English people of Jewish descent
Jewish women politicians
People from Leamington Spa
20th-century British women politicians
20th-century English women
20th-century English people
Women councillors in England